Pitchanart Sakakorn (born 22 May 1981 in Bangkok, Thailand) is a Thai actress. Her starring film roles include Pattaya Maniac, Buppah Rahtree Phase 2: Rahtree Returns and The Victim.

She has a bachelor's degree from Assumption University.


Filmography
 Butterfly in Grey (2002)
 Pattaya Maniac (2004)
 Buppah Rahtree Phase 2: Rahtree Returns (2005)
 Ghost Variety (2005)
 Black Night (Segment, The Lost Memory, 2006)
 The Victim (2006)

Television dramas 
 2002 Sapai Jao (สะใภ้จ้าว) (Broadcast Thai​ Television/Ch.3) as Ying Koy (หม่อมราชวงศ์หญิงเทพีเพ็ญแสง รัชนีกุล (คุณหญิงก้อย)) 
 2002  (นางมาร) (Pau Jin Jong/Ch.7) as Ranee (ระณี) 
 2003  (ก็ว่าจะไม่รัก) (Broadcast Thai​ Television/Ch.3) as Amnid (อำนิษฐ์) 
 2004  (ขอพลิกฟ้าตามล่าเธอ) (/Ch.3) as Rinsay (รินทราย) 
 2005  (กลิ่นแก้วตำหนักขาว) (Quiz And Quest/Ch.3) as Pimpha (พิมพา) 
 2005 Wimarn Sai (2005) (วิมานทราย) (Exact-Scenario/Ch.5) as Lookmee (สิริรัศมี) 
 2005 Hoi Un Chun Ruk Tur (ฮอยอันฉันรักเธอ) (Red Drama/Ch.3) as Wikarnda (วิกานดา) 
 2005  (ปิ๊ง) (/Ch.3) as (ดีดี้) 
 2005  (ใต้ร่มเงารัก) (/Ch.3) as (มีนา) 
 2007  (ภูตพยาบาท) (/ITV) as (ณัฐฐา) with Atsadawut Luengsuntorn
 2009 Mea Luang (เมียหลวง) (Dara VDO/Ch.7) as Waranaree (วรนารี) 
 2009 Buang Ruk Gammatep (บ่วงรักกามเทพ) (Exact-Scenario/Ch.5) as Nina (นีน่า) 
 2010 Reun Son Ruk (เรือนซ่อนรัก) (Dida Video Production/Ch.7) as Ornanong (อรอนงค์)
 2010  (เธอกับเขาและรักของเรา) (Polyplus entertainment/Ch.7) as Sagee (ศจี)
 2011 Nai Roy Ruk (ในรอยรัก) (Dara VDO/Ch.7) as Pinsuda (Kib) (พินสุดา (กิ๊บ))
 2012 Prik Gub Klur (พริกกับเกลือ) (Masquerade/Ch.7) as Marasri (มารศรี)
 2012 Qi Pao (กี่เพ้า) (Broadcast Thai​ Television/Ch.3) as Jao Lin Peuy (Pei Pei) (เจ้าหลินเพ่ย (เพ่ยเพ่ย))
 2012  (เจ้าแม่จำเป็น) (Exact-Scenario/Ch.5) as (มิ้ว)
 2015 Tawun Thud Burapah 2015 (ตะวันตัดบูรพา) (Exact-Scenario/One 31) as Chomchat (เจิมฉัตร) with Anatpol Sirichoomsang
 2016  (หมอผี) (SRIKHUMRUNG PRODUCTION/PPTVHD36) as (รัตติกาล) 
 2018 Rak Chan Sawan Jat Hai (รักฉันสวรรค์จัดให้) (/Ch.8) as Netchanok (เนตรชนก (รับเชิญ)) 
 2018 Mia 2018 (เมีย 2018 รักเลือกได้) (The One Enterprise/One 31) as (มุนินทร์ (นิน)) with Puntakarn Thongjure
 2019 Taley Rissaya (2018) (ทะเลริษยา) (The One Enterprise/One 31) as Tikana (ตรีคณา) 
 2019 Rerk Sanghan (ฤกษ์สังหาร) (The One Enterprise/One 31) as Chingduang (พ.ต.ต. พ.ญ.ชิงดวง พงศ์กรณ์กุล) with Pobtorn Sunthornyarnkit
 2022 Wiwa Fah Laep (วิวาห์ฟ้าแลบ) (The One Enterprise-Por Dee Kam/One 31) as Nat (นภัสสร วงศ์ฤกษ์ไพศาล (แนท)) with Akarat Nimitchai
 2023  (จำแลงรัก) (The One Enterprise/One 31) as 

Television series
 2016 Club Friday The Series 8 (คลับฟรายเดย์ เดอะซีรีส์ 8 ตอน รักแท้หรือแค่เอาชนะ) (A Time Media/GMM 25) as (ดา) 
 2018 Club Friday The Series 10 (คลับฟรายเดย์ เดอะซีรีส์ 10 รักนอกใจ ตอน เหตุเกิดจากความรู้สึกผิด) (CHANGE2561/GMM 25) as (แพท) with Pathompong Reonchaidee

Television sitcom
 2010  (เนื้อคู่อยากรู้ว่าใคร ตอนที่ 13) (GMM Tai Hub/Ch.5) as (สายลับ 001(ฟ้า) (รับเชิญ)) 
 2020 3 Num 3 Mum x2 (3 หนุ่ม 3 มุม x2) (The One Enterprise/One 31) as Prae (ณาลัลน์ ตรีพูนสุข (แพร) (รับเชิญ))

Music Video 
 20  -  (/YouTube:rsfriends) with 
 20  -  (/YouTube:rsfriends) with 
 20  -  (/YouTube:rsfriends) with 
 20  -  (/YouTube:rsfriends) with 
 20  -  (/YouTube:rsfriends) with 
 20  -  (/YouTube:rsfriends) with 
 20  -  (/YouTube:rsfriends) with 
 20  -  (/YouTube:rsfriends) with 
 20  -  (/YouTube:rsfriends) with 
 20  -  (/YouTube:rsfriends) with

MC 
Television
 2010  (คนอวดผี (รับเชิญ)) (/Ch.7) (2010)
 2015 E- Entertainment (/Ch.8) (2015)

Online
 20  (YouTube:)

External links

1981 births
Phitchanat Sakhakon
Phitchanat Sakhakon
Phitchanat Sakhakon
Phitchanat Sakhakon
Phitchanat Sakhakon
Living people
Phitchanat Sakhakon
Phitchanat Sakhakon
Phitchanat Sakhakon
Phitchanat Sakhakon
Phitchanat Sakhakon
Phitchanat Sakhakon